Dankner is a surname. Notable people with the surname include:

Amnon Dankner (1946–2013), Israeli newspaper editor and writer
Nochi Dankner (born 1954), Israeli businessman